The South African Railways Class 33-400 of 1968 was a South African and Namibian diesel-electric locomotive.

Between 1968 and 1970, the South African Railways placed 115 Class  General Electric type U20C diesel-electric locomotives in service. Many of them were transferred to TransNamib, the Namibian Railways, upon South West Africa’s independence on 21 March 1990.

Manufacturer
The Class 33-400 type GE U20C diesel-electric locomotive was designed for the South African Railways (SAR) by General Electric (GE) and built by the South African General Electric-Dorman Long Locomotive Group (SA GE-DL, later Dorbyl).

Class 33 series
Both manufacturers also produced locomotives for the subsequent SAR Classes 34, 35 and 36.

The two GE-built Classes were virtually identical in appearance, but could be distinguished from each other by some ventilation openings on their bodywork.
 The Class 33-000 had press-formed louvre openings in both short hood doors on the right hand side of the nose, while the Class  had no opening in either of these doors.
 Just to the rear of the cab on both sides of the long hood and more or less in line with the cab windows, both models had panels with three ventilation openings. These had two horizontal bars in each opening on the Class  and press-formed louvre openings on the Class .

These doors and panels could and sometimes did get swapped between models, either as replace­ment for damaged items or by chance during overhauls. An example is SCTP no. 1435, sold to the Congolese Company for Transportation and Ports (SCTP), illustrated below, of which the left-side door on the nose had apparently been swapped with that of their Class  no. 1436, illustrated alongside.

Service

South African Railways
Upon being commissioned, many of the Class  locomotives were placed in service in South West Africa (SWA) while some went to the Mafeking line working out of Johannesburg. Forty-five of them were eventually transferred to TransNamib, the Namibian Railways, upon SWA’s independence on 21 March 1990. They retained their SAR engine numbers on the TransNamib roster, but without the "33-" prefix. Some have since been sold while others have been rebuilt with reconditioned prime movers by TransNamib's workshops in Windhoek and renumbered from no. 501 up.

The two cabside number plates on Class  locomotives were not identical. Usually, all the locomotives in a Class would have either Afrikaans or English at the top of all their number plates. On the Class  number plates, the inscription was in Afrikaans at the top on the right hand or driver’s side, and in English at the top on the left hand or driver's assistant's side.

In South Africa, most of the Class  locomotives survived in mainline and branch line service well into the 21st century, for example on the lines from De Aar to Upington, from Worcester to Voorbaai and on suburban service out of East London. From 2009, some were also employed out of Cape Town on the Overberg line across Sir Lowry's Pass to Caledon and on the Bitterfontein line up the West Coast where they replaced several Classes  and  locomotives that were leased to private railway operators in several Southern African countries.

Zambia
Between October 1978 and May 1993, Zambia Railways (ZR) hired locomotives to solve its chronic shortages in motive power, mainly from South Africa but at times also from Zaire, Zimbabwe, the TAZARA Railway and even the Zambian Copper Mines. In Zambia, the South African locomotives were mainly used on goods trains between Livingstone and Kitwe, sometimes in tandem with a ZR locomotive and occasionally also on passenger trains.

Locomotives were selected from a pool of engines which was allocated by the Railways for hire to Zambia. The South African fleet in Zambia was never constant since loco­motives were continually exchanged as they became due back in South Africa for their three-monthly services. The locomotives were initially selected from the Classes , 35-000 and 35-200, but by December 1989 some Class  locomotives also began to serve one or more tours of duty in Zambia.

The pool of Class 33-400 locomotives allocated by the Railways for hire to ZR from time to time included the locomotives as shown in the "Leased to" column in the table. The last Class  locomotive to serve in Zambia was no.  which was returned in April 1992. By the end of May 1993, no more South African locomotives were working in Zambia.

South America
In 1997, twenty Class  locomotives were sold to Ferrovia Centro-Atlântica (FCA). They were since resold in 1999 to América Latina Logística (ALL) in Brazil where they retained their FCA engine numbers.

Of these, two were resold again to Sociedad Química y Minera (SQM) in Chile.

Of these twenty locomotives in South America, ten still survived by July 2010. These include the three units sold to FOB and subsequently resold to EFO and SQM, five locomotives reported as non-operating and two which were returned to Rede Ferroviária Federal, Sociedade Anônima (RFFSA), the state-owned federal railroad network of Brazil.

Sudan Railways
Ten Class 33-400 locomotives were sold to the Sudan Railways.

Democratic Republic of the Congo
In 2015, some Class 33-000 and Class 33-400 locomotives were sold to the Congolese Company for Transportation and Ports (SCTP, formerly Onatra) in the Democratic Republic of the Congo. These locomotives were refurbished in South Africa prior to being delivered to their new owners.

Industrial service
Six Class 33-400 locomotives were sold to Iscor (now Kumba Iron Ore) for use at its Vanderbijlpark steel works and at Kumba’s Grootgeluk Colliery at Ellisras.

Preservation
One loco Class 33-400 no. 33-487 has been marked down on TRANSnet Heritage Foundation as a historic locomotive set to be preserved in the near future it currently resides at East London - Cambridge.

Liveries
The class 33-400 were all delivered in the Gulf Red livery with yellow side-stripes on the long hood, a yellow V on each end, signal red buffer beams and unpainted steel cowcatchers. Most of them wore this livery throughout their SAR service life. In the Spoornet era at least one was painted in Spoornet orange livery with yellow and blue chevron buffer beams and in the Transnet Freight Rail era at least one was painted in its red, green and yellow livery.

Works numbers
The Class 33-400 builder’s works numbers and eventual disposition are listed in the table.

Illustration
The main picture and the following serve to illustrate the distinguishing features of the Class and some of the liveries that they served in.

References

3340
C-C locomotives
Co′Co′ locomotives
Co+Co locomotives
General Electric locomotives
Dorbyl locomotives
Cape gauge railway locomotives
Railway locomotives introduced in 1968
1968 in South Africa